Rudy Alejandro Cardozo Fernández (born 14 February 1990) is a Bolivian footballer who plays for The Strongest and the Bolivia national team as a midfielder.

Club career

Early career
Born in Tarija, Cardozo was a Club Bolívar youth graduate. In the 2008 summer he moved to Israel second division side Ironi Ramat HaSharon, making his senior debuts for the latter in the campaign.

Bolívar
In July 2009 Cardozo returned to Bolívar, but only appeared rarely for the club during his first year. On 17 May 2010 he scored his first goals, netting a brace in a 2–2 draw against Aurora.

Cardozo was an undisputed starter in 2010 appearing in 47 matches and scoring nine goals. He was also a part of the squad in the 2011 and 2012–13 winning campaigns, always as a first-choice.

In August 2012 Cardozo was due to join Russian Premier League's FC Alania Vladikavkaz, but the deal collapsed. On 22 October 2014, after scoring in a 6–1 home routing over Club Deportivo San José, he harassed Bolívar's assistant manager Vladimir Soria, and was later suspended by the club.

On 13 January 2015 Cardozo moved to Associação Portuguesa de Desportos, for six months.

International career
Cardozo represented the Bolivia under-20 side at the 2009 South American Youth Championship, appearing in a 1–4 loss against Paraguay and a 1–5 loss to Brazil as Bolivia finished last in their group.

Cardozo made his debut for the main squad on 11 August 2010, starting in a 1–1 friendly draw against Colombia. He was also named in Gustavo Quinteros' 23-man squad for 2011 Copa America, but appeared in only one match in the competition.

Cardozo scored his first international goal on 2 September of the following year, netting his side's second in 2–2 draw against Peru.

As of 1 June 2016, he has earned 37 caps, scoring 5 goals and represented his country in 17 FIFA World Cup qualification matches.

International goals
Scores and results list Bolivia's goal tally first.

References

External links
 
 
 
 

1990 births
Living people
People from Tarija
Association football midfielders
Bolivian footballers
Bolivian expatriate footballers
Bolivia international footballers
2011 Copa América players
Club Bolívar players
Hapoel Nir Ramat HaSharon F.C. players
Associação Portuguesa de Desportos players
The Strongest players
Liga Leumit players
Bolivian expatriate sportspeople in Brazil
Expatriate footballers in Brazil
Expatriate footballers in Israel